The first USS Wando was a steamer captured by the Union Navy during the American Civil War. In commission from 1864 to 1865, she was used by the United States Navy as a gunboat in support of the Union Navy blockade of Confederate waterways.

Capture 
Wando was built as the side-wheel steamer SS Let Her Rip in 1864 at Glasgow, Scotland, for use as a Confederate blockade runner in the American Civil War. Let Her Rip sailed under British colors until May 1864 when the Chicora Import and Export Company of Charleston, South Carolina, purchased her. In July 1864, after her first blockade-running trip into Wilmington, North Carolina, she was renamed SS Wando.

Wando was captured at sea off Cape Romain, South Carolina, by the Union side-wheel steamer USS Fort Jackson on 21 October 1864 as she attempted to slip away from the Confederate coast laden with cotton. The U.S. Navy purchased the ship from the Boston, Massachusetts, prize court on 5 November 1864, converted her into a gunboat, and commissioned her as USS Wando at the Boston Navy Yard on 22 December 1864, Acting Master Frederick T. King in command.

Union actions 
 
Late in December 1864, Wando proceeded south for duty with the South Atlantic Blockading Squadron. She arrived at Port Royal, South Carolina, on 5 January 1865 and was stationed on blockade duty off Charleston in February.
 
Wando departed Charleston on 11 February 1865 and joined in amphibious operations against the Confederate fort and batteries at Andersonville, Bull's Bay, South Carolina, lasting from 13 February to 17 February 1865. The fort and batteries were silenced, prompting the evacuation of Charleston on 18 February 1865. In March, Wando joined the blockading force off Georgetown, South Carolina, and then returned to Charleston in April 1865.

Decommissioning and sale 
 
Wando remained at Charleston until ordered north to the New York Navy Yard on 28 July 1865. She was decommissioned there on 10 August 1865 and was sold at public auction on 30 November 1865 to H. Allen.  She then became the commercial steamship SS Wando, and lasted until February 1872, when she sank in a storm.

See also

Blockade runners of the American Civil War
Blockade mail of the Confederacy

References

External links 
 Department of the Navy: Naval Historical Center: U.S. Navy Ships: Online Library of Selected Images: USS Wando (1864-1865). Formerly the blockade runner Wando (originally named Let Her Rip). Later became the civilian steamship Wando (1865-1872)

Ships of the Union Navy
Steamships of the United States Navy
Gunboats of the United States Navy
American Civil War patrol vessels of the United States
Ships built on the River Clyde
1864 ships